John Sale (c. 1675 – 7 July 1732) was an Irish politician of the 18th century.

Biography

Sale was born around 1675. A "John Sale" was Sheriff of County Dublin in 1705; this may have been the same man.

He was a Doctor of Laws and later registrar of the Church of Ireland diocese of Dublin. He was elected to the Irish House of Commons in 1715 for the Carysfort borough and served there until his death in 1732.

Family

Sale married Ellinor Desminières, daughter of Robert Desminières, a Sligo merchant of Huguenot extraction.

His eldest daughter Elizabeth married Richard Wesley, 1st Baron Mornington and was the mother of Garret Wesley, 1st Earl of Mornington; thus, John Sale was great-grandfather to Arthur Wellesley, 1st Duke of Wellington.

References

18th-century Irish lawyers
Irish MPs 1715–1727
Irish MPs 1727–1760
Members of the Parliament of Ireland (pre-1801) for County Wicklow constituencies
1732 deaths
1675 births